[

Simon Goossens (15 June 1893 – 10 October 1964) was a Belgian sculptor. In 1920 he won a silver medal in the art competitions of the Antwerp Olympic Games for his "Les Patineurs" ("Skaters").

References

Further reading
 M. Eemans, 1975: Moderne Kunst in België. Hasselt : Heideland-Orbis, 1975

External links
 Agentschap Onroerend Erfgoed 2021: Goossens, Simon, Retrieved 24 December 2021 
 DatabaseOlympics: profile

1893 births
1964 deaths
Olympic silver medalists in art competitions
20th-century Belgian sculptors
Olympic competitors in art competitions
Medalists at the 1920 Summer Olympics
Art competitors at the 1920 Summer Olympics